Thorpe Constantine is a civil parish in the district of Lichfield, Staffordshire, England.  It contains eight buildings that are recorded in the National Heritage List for England.  Of these, one is listed at Grade II*, the middle of the three grades, and the others are at Grade II, the lowest grade.  The parish contains the small village of Thorpe Constantine and the former village of Statfold, and is otherwise rural.  The listed buildings consist of two churches, a memorial in a churchyard, two small country houses and associated structures, a farmhouse, and a row of cottages.


Key

Buildings

References

Citations

Sources

Lists of listed buildings in Staffordshire